Kikuko (written: 喜久子, 伎共子 or 記久子) is a feminine Japanese given name. Notable people with the name include:

, Japanese singer and voice actress
, Japanese composer
, Japanese writer
, Japanese pianist, music educator and classical composer
, later Princess Takamatsu of Japan
, Japanese writer

Japanese feminine given names